Berdyshla (Bärźeşle) is a rural locality (a village) in Petrovsky Selsoviet, Ishimbaysky District, Bashkortostan, Russia. The population was 212 as of 2010. There are 2 streets.

Geography 
Berdyshla is located 30 km northeast of Ishimbay (the district's administrative centre) by road. Pavlovka is the nearest rural locality.

References 

Rural localities in Ishimbaysky District